The Critics' Choice Television Award for Best Unstructured Reality Show is one of the award categories presented annually by the Critics' Choice Television Awards (BTJA). In 2016, the category Best Reality Series was separated into two categories – Best Unstructured Reality Show and Best Structured Reality Show. The winners are selected by a group of television critics that are part of the Broadcast Television Critics Association.

Winners and nominees

2010s

Best Reality Series

Best Unstructured Reality Show

See also
 TCA Award for Outstanding Achievement in Reality Programming
 Primetime Emmy Award for Outstanding Unstructured Reality Program

References

Critics' Choice Television Awards